The 1933 Australian Grand Prix was a motor race held at the Phillip Island circuit in Victoria, Australia on 20 March 1933. Organised by the Light Car of Australia, it was the sixth Australian Grand Prix and the sixth to be held at Phillip Island. The race, which was the most important annual car competition in Australia, was open to cars of up to 2300cc engine capacity, the 2000cc limit of previous years having been increased for 1933. The Grand Prix was won by Bill Thompson driving a Riley Brooklands. Thompson's win was his third Australian Grand Prix victory.

Race format
The Grand Prix was staged as a handicap race with the first car, the Austin of Ken McKinney, scheduled to start 35 minutes before the last car, the Bugatti of Bill Williamson. McKinney was subsequently re-handicapped to 32 minutes. As Williamson's car was withdrawn prior to the race, the Bugatti of Arthur Terdich (off six minutes) was the last car to start.

Race classification

Key
 FO: Flagged off. (completed the full race distance but not within the allocated time limit)
 DNF: Did not finish
 DNS: Did not start

Notes
 Race distance: 324.280 km (31 laps x 10.478 km)
 Winner's race time: 3h 9m 05s (102.90 km/h)
 Only six cars completed the course within the allotted time limit.
 Fastest Time: Bill Thompson, 2h 45m 51s
 Fastest lap: Merton Wreford

References

External links
 Grand Prix. Won by a Riley. The Sydney Morning Herald, Tuesday, 21 Mar 1933, Page 9, as archived at trove.nla.gov.au
 Motor Racing at Cowes, The Argus, Tuesday 21 March 1933, as archived at trove.nla.gov.au
 Australian Grand Prix is on Again: Bill Thompson wins 200 miles handicap on Philip Island course, Video at www.gettyimages.com.au

Grand Prix
Australian Grand Prix
Motorsport at Phillip Island
Australian Grand Prix